The wild boar (Sus scrofa, a.k.a. simply boar, or wild pig) is the wild ancestor of the domestic pig.  The term may also refer to:
 Wild Boar (film) a 2013 documentary
 Wild Boar, English translation of Wilde Sau, the German World War II night fighter tactic
 The Wild Boars, the local junior football team rescued in the Tham Luang cave rescue in Thailand in 2018
 Elon Musk's submarine, a rescue pod named after the team.
 Kragujevac Wild Boars, American football team in Serbia

See also
 Boar (disambiguation)
 Feral pig
 Wild pig (disambiguation)